The 2021–22 División de Honor de Hockey Hierba was the 56th season of the División de Honor de Hockey Hierba, the premier men's field hockey league in Spain. The season began on 8 May 2022 and finished with the championship final on 8 May 2022.

Club de Campo were the defending champions. Atlètic Terrassa won their 22nd title by defeating Real Club de Polo in the final 6–5 in a shoot-out after the match finished 2–2.

Changes from 2020–21
For this season the league returned to ten teams after last season was played with 12. For the 2022–23 season the league will again have 12 teams so no teams will be relegated directly this season, the 10th placed team only has to play a relegation play-off.

Teams

Sardinero won the División de Honor Masculina B and were promoted while CD Terrassa, Giner de los Ríos and Linia 22 were relegated.

Number of teams by autonomous community

Regular season

Standings

Results

Final 4
The Final 4 was hosted by Club de Campo in Madrid on 7 and 8 May 2022.

Bracket

Semi-finals

Final

Play-outs
The play-outs were played on 29 May and 4 June 2022.

Overview

|}

Matches

Sardinero won series 2–0 and both teams remain in their respective division.

References

División de Honor de Hockey Hierba
Division de Honor de Hockey Hierba
field hockey
field hockey